The Civil List Act 1727 (1 Geo. 2 St. 1 c. 1) was an Act of the Parliament of Great Britain passed upon the accession of George II.

The Act granted the Crown the Civil List revenues (mainly customs and excise), estimated to give the King an annual income of £800,000. If these revenues yielded less than £800,000 then Parliament would make up the shortfall. If on the other hand they were worth more than £800,000, the King could retain the surplus as well. The Act differed from previous Civil List arrangements in that under the terms of the Act the income of the Crown would increase with the wealth of the nation. In the early years of George II's reign, the revenues fell below the stipulated amount of £800,000 but by the end of his reign he was receiving £876,988.

Notes

Great Britain Acts of Parliament 1727